Trudestra is a genus of moths of the family Noctuidae.

Species
 Trudestra hadeniformis (Smith, 1894)

References
Natural History Museum Lepidoptera genus database
Trudestra at funet

Hadeninae